The 1998 Haringey Council election took place on 7 May 1998 to elect members of Haringey London Borough Council in London, England. The whole council was up for election and the Labour party stayed in overall control of the council.

Background
Following their landslide victory in the 1994 elections, Labour were defending 57 of the 59 seats on Haringey Council. At these elections the Conservatives successfully defended their two seats in Highgate ward, but failed to regain any others. The Liberal Democrats became the official opposition after winning three seats in Muswell Hill ward, their first ever on Haringey Council. One of these three councillors was Lynne Featherstone, who would go on to become MP for Hornsey and Wood Green.

Election result

|}

Ward results

Alexandra

Archway

Bowes Park

Thomas Davidson was a sitting councillor for Fortis Green ward

Bruce Grove

Coleraine

Bernice Vanier was a sitting councillor for Tottenham Central ward

Crouch End

Fortis Green

Green Lanes

Harringay

High Cross

Highgate

Hornsey Central

Hornsey Vale

Muswell Hill

Elizabeth Singleton was a sitting councillor for South Tottenham ward

Noel Park

Park

Seven Sisters

South Hornsey

South Tottenham

Tottenham Central

West Green

Rafaat Mughal was a sitting councillor for Woodside ward

White Hart Lane

Woodside

George Meehan was a sitting councillor for Coleraine ward

Jayanti Patel was a sitting councillor for White Hart Lane ward

References

1998
1998 London Borough council elections